Chinar: Daastaan-E-Ishq is a 2015 Bollywood movie directed by Sharique Minhaj and produced by Rajesh R Jain.

Cast
 Faisal Khan as Jamaal
 Inayat Sharma as Surriya
 Dalip Tahil as Aziz Cinema Khan
 Pramod Moutho as Salaam
 Shahbaz Khan as Khwaja Sahab and others
 Parveen Kaur as Aziz Cinema Khan's wife

Filming
This film was shot in Kashmir and Mumbai.

Release
This film was released in India on 16 October 2015.

Soundtrack 
The soundtrack for the album was composed by Salim Sen and Siddique Sen and lyrics was penned by Jamil Ahmed.

References

External links
 

2015 films
2010s Hindi-language films